Muhammad Asim Nazir (born 20 November 1970) is a Pakistani politician who has been a member of the National Assembly of Pakistan, since August 2018. Previously he was a member of the National Assembly from 2002 to May 2018.

Early life
He was born on 20 November 1970 in a Famous Political and Landlord Arain family of Faisalabad. He is son of former member of national assembly Chouhdry Nazir Ahmad.

Political career
He was elected to the National Assembly of Pakistan as a candidate of Pakistan Muslim League (Q) (PML-Q) from Constituency NA-77 (Faisalabad-III) in 2002 Pakistani general election. He received 63,296 votes and defeated Muhammad Akram Chaudhry, a candidate of Pakistan Muslim League (N) (PML-N).

He was re-elected to the National Assembly as a candidate of PML-Q from Constituency NA-77 (Faisalabad-III) in 2008 Pakistani general election. He received 63,776 votes and defeated Muhammad Tallal Chaudry.

He was re-elected to the National Assembly as a candidate of PML-N from Constituency NA-77 (Faisalabad-III) in 2013 Pakistani general election. He received 98,057 votes and defeated Zaheer ud Din, a candidate of PML-Q.

He was re-elected to the National Assembly as an independent candidate from Constituency NA-101 (Faisalabad-I) in 2018 Pakistani general election. Following his successful election, he announced to join Pakistan Tehreek-e-Insaf (PTI) in August 2018.

Electoral history

2018

References

Living people
1975 births
Pakistani MNAs 2002–2007
Pakistani MNAs 2008–2013
Pakistani MNAs 2013–2018
Pakistani MNAs 2018–2023
Pakistan Muslim League (Q) MNAs
Pakistan Muslim League (N) MNAs
Pakistan Tehreek-e-Insaf MNAs